Alexandros Bimai (born 11 July 1997) is an Albanian-Greek professional footballer who plays as a midfielder.

References

1997 births
Living people
Greek people of Albanian descent
Super League Greece 2 players
Football League (Greece) players
Gamma Ethniki players
Kallithea F.C. players
Apollon Larissa F.C. players
Association football midfielders
Footballers from Athens
Greek footballers